The Oregon Open is the Oregon state open golf tournament, open to both amateur and professional golfers. It is organized by the Pacific Northwest section of the PGA of America. The tournament was first played in 1905 and has been played annually (with minor disruptions) since 1925 at a variety of courses around the state. It was considered a PGA Tour event in the late 1920s and early 1930s.

Winners

2022 Jeff Gove
2021 Kennedy Swann (a)
2020 Brady Sharp
2019 Reid Hatley (a)
2018 Colin Inglis
2017 Russell Grove
2016 Ryan Benzel
2015 David Lebeck
2014 Derek Barron
2013 Hans Reimiers (a)
2012 Brian Thornton
2011 Reid Martin (a)
2010 Derek Berg (a)
2009 Brian Nosler
2008 Corey Prugh
2007 Josh Immordino
2006 Scott Krieger
2005 Erik Hanson (a)
2004 Jeff Coston
2003 Tracy Vest
2002 Darek Franklin
2001 Ken Bensel
2000 Bill Porter
1999 Michael Combs
1998 Bill Porter
1997 Bill Porter
1996 Dan Koesters
1995 Jeff Coston
1994 Bill Tindall
1993 John McComish
1992 Mike Gove
1991 Doug Doxsie
1990 Pat Fitzsimons
1989 Tim Hval (a)
1988 Greg Whisman
1987 Jim Strickland (a)
1986 Doug Campbell
1985 Rick Acton
1984 Mike Davis
1983 Scott Taylor (a)
1982 Walt Porterfield, Jr.
1981 Mike Warner (a)
1980 Doug Campbell
1979 Peter Jacobsen
1978 Rick Acton
1977 Rick Acton
1976 Peter Jacobsen (a)
1975 Craig Griswold
1974 Gene Edstrom (a)
1973 Bob Duden
1972 Rick Acton
1971 Ted Denham
1970 Bob Duden
1969 Bob Duden
1968 Pat Fitzsimons (a)
1967 Bob Duden
1966 Al Feldman
1965 Mike Dudik
1964 Jerry Mowlds
1963 Glenn Spivey
1962 Bob Duden
1961 Bill Eggers
1960 Bill Eggers
1959 Bob Duden
1958 Dick Yost (a)
1957 Oscar "Ockie" Eliason
1956 Gene "Bunny" Mason
1955 Bruce Cudd (a)
1954 Bruce Cudd (a)
1953 Bob Duden
1952 Bob Duden
1951 John Langford, Jr.
1950 Harold West
1949 Ron Clark (a)
1948 Harold West
1947 Charles Congdon
1946 Lou Jennings (a)
1943–1945 No tournament
1942 Al Zimmerman
1941 Bob Litton
1937–1940 No tournament
1936 Ray Mangrum
1935 No tournament
1934 Ted Longworth
1933 Al Zimmerman
1931–1932 No tournament
1930 Leo Diegel
1929 Horton Smith
1928 Oscar Willing (a)
1927 Tommy Armour
1926 No tournament
1925 Bert Wilde
1906–1924 No tournament
1905 George Smith

(a) – amateur

External links
PGA of America – Pacific Northwest section
List of winners

Former PGA Tour events
Golf in Oregon
PGA of America sectional tournaments
State Open golf tournaments
Sports competitions in Oregon
Annual events in Oregon
Recurring sporting events established in 1905
1905 establishments in Oregon